Calliostoma hirondellei is a species of sea snail, a marine gastropod mollusk in the family Calliostomatidae.

Description
The height of the shell attains 32 mm. The imperforated shell is very solid and thick. It is somewhat shiny. The spire has a regular conical shape. It contains eight whorls. The first ones are flat, the others somewhat concave. They are separated by a shallow suture. The embryonic whorls are smooth, the others are decorated with decurrent spiral striae (six on the penultimate whorl). The ridge closest to the suture is slightly granular. The very thin growth lines are oblique. The body whorl is slightly expanded. The base is convex and is ornamented with 11 to 13 concentric striae, somewhat less pronounced than the others and closer to each other. The subquadrangular aperture is pearly inside. Its edges are covered with a very thin callosity. The thick columella is oblique. The outer lip is declivitous and slightly widens at the top. On the inside it has a thick bead somewhat behind the sharp edge.

Distribution
This species occurs in the Atlantic Ocean off the Azores at bathyal depths.

References

 Dautzenberg P. & Fischer H., 1896: Dragages effectués par l'Hirondelle et par la Princesse Alice 1888–1895. 1. Mollusques Gastropodes; Mémoires de la Société Zoologique de France 9: 395–498, pl. 15–22
 Gofas, S.; Le Renard, J.; Bouchet, P. (2001). Mollusca, in: Costello, M.J. et al. (Ed.) (2001). European register of marine species: a check-list of the marine species in Europe and a bibliography of guides to their identification. Collection Patrimoines Naturels, 50: pp. 180–213

External links
 

hirondellei
Gastropods described in 1896